Ptychochromoides vondrozo is a critically endangered species of cichlid endemic to the Mananara-sud river and its tributaries near Vondrozo in southeastern Madagascar. These are deep and moderate to fast-flowing. It is also threatened by other species that have been introduced to the region. It reaches a length of  SL.

References

vondrozo
Freshwater fish of Madagascar
Fish described in 2001
Taxonomy articles created by Polbot
Endemic fauna of Madagascar